The Buffalo Hills are a mountain range in Washoe County, Nevada.

References 

Mountain ranges of Nevada
Mountain ranges of the Great Basin
Mountain ranges of Washoe County, Nevada